Lamia Yammine (born 1974) is a Lebanese politician. From 21 January to 10 August 2020, she served as Minister of Labor in the cabinet of Prime Minister Hassan Diab.

References 

Living people
1974 births
Place of birth missing (living people)
Women government ministers of Lebanon

Marada Movement politicians
21st-century Lebanese women politicians
21st-century Lebanese politicians